In mathematics, Lehrbuch der Topologie (German for "textbook of topology") is a book by Herbert Seifert and William Threlfall, first published in 1934 and published in an English translation in 1980. It was one of the earliest textbooks on algebraic topology, and was the standard reference on this topic for many years.

Albert W. Tucker wrote a review.

Notes

References

 Reprinted by Chelsea Publishing Company 1947 and AMS 2004.

History of mathematics
Mathematics textbooks
Algebraic topology
1934 non-fiction books
German books